Minera Autlan is a mining company and the largest producer of ferroalloys in Mexico.

See also  
List of companies traded on the Bolsa Mexicana de Valores
List of Mexican companies
Economy of Mexico

References 

Mining companies of Mexico